Alam Sutera LRT station is a Light Rapid Transit station serving Alam Sutera, a township in Bukit Jalil about 21 km south of Kuala Lumpur, the capital of Malaysia. It is operated under the Sri Petaling Line. Like most other LRT stations operating in Klang Valley, this station is elevated.

References

External links 
Alam Sutera LRT Station - KL MRT Line Integrations

Ampang Line
Petaling District
Railway stations opened in 2015